Murphy (wrestler) may refer to:

 Buddy Murphy or "Murphy" (born 1988), Australian professional wrestler
 Matt Murphy (wrestler) (born 1979), American professional wrestler
 Mikael Judas (born 1974), American professional wrestler known as "Murphy"